Jonathan Erlich and Artem Sitak were the defending champions, but lost in the first round to Marcel Granollers and Sergiy Stakhovsky.

Granollers and Stakhovsky went on to win the title, defeating Marcelo Arévalo and Miguel Ángel Reyes-Varela in the final, 6–7(10–12), 6–4, [13–11].

Seeds

Draw

Draw

References 
 Draw

Doubles